Scrub Daddy is a cleaning product company best known for an eponymous sponge it manufactures in the shape of a smiley face. The product is made of a polymer which changes texturefirm in cold water and soft in warm water. As of 2019, Scrub Daddy had the highest revenue of any product successfully pitched on the ABC reality show Shark Tank.

History 
After damaging the exterior of a vehicle when cleaning the outside, detailer Aaron Krause invented a line of buffing and polishing pads. The company was acquired by 3M in August 2008. 3M did not purchase a line of sponges Krause had invented, leaving them to sit in his factory. Five years later, Krause used the remaining sponges to clean his dishes and lawn furniture. According to Krause, this is when he "realized his multi-million dollar idea."

According to the company's website, Scrub Daddy, Inc. was founded in 2012 with grassroots marketing. On the Shark Tank episode originally airing in October 2012, Lori Greiner made a 20% equity stake deal with Krause for $200,000. The following day, Greiner and Krause sold out of 42,000 sponges in under seven minutes on QVC. Greiner then helped Scrub Daddy to be sold in retail stores such as Bed, Bath & Beyond. In January 2017, Scrub Daddy's total revenues surpassed $100 million – the highest of any Shark Tank product. As of October 2019, the company's lifetime sales were $209 million. In Season 14 Episode 13, it was reported that Scrub Daddy in 10 years has 273 employees, 160 products, sold in 257,000 retail locations, top 5 grossing company in shark tank history, doing over $670m in retail sales since launch.

Products 
Scrub Daddy is made from a strong "high-tech polymer", which is likely to be polycaprolactone based on prior patent filings. The texture changes in water: firm in cold water, soft in warm water. The original Scrub Daddy is a yellow circular scrubber with a smiling face punched into it. Krause has two patents on its design.

Other products 
The brand consists of more than 20 products, including scouring pads, dual-sided sponges, sink organizers, soap dispensers and household erasers.

References 

Scrub daddy

External links
 Official website

American inventions
Cleaning product brands
American companies established in 2012